The Muslim Reform Movement is a U.S.-based organization dedicated to reform in Islam based on values of peace, human rights, and secular governance.

The organization was founded on December 4, 2015, when the founders read a "Declaration of Reform" at the National Press Club in Washington, D.C. The founders then went to the Saudi-affiliated Islamic Center of Washington and posted the Declaration of Reform on the doors of mosque "denouncing violent jihad, rejecting Islamic statism and opposing the 'ideology of violent Islamic extremism.'" Founding signatories of the Muslim Reform Movement are Asra Nomani, Tahir Aslam Gora, Tawfik Hamid, Usama Hasan, Arif Humayun, Farahnaz Ispahani, Zuhdi Jasser, Naser Khader, Courtney Lonergan, Hasan Mahmud, Raheel Raza, Sohail Raza, and Salma Siddiqui.

Announcing the founding of the Muslim Reform Movement on NBC's Meet the Press on December 6, 2015, Asra Nomani said,

See also

 Freedom of speech
 Islamic Modernism
 Liberalism and progressivism within Islam
 Islam and modernity
 Women's rights

References

External links
 

2015 establishments in the United States
2015 in Islam
Islamic organizations based in the United States
Liberal and progressive movements within Islam
Islamic organizations established in 2015